Heklang  is a village development committee in Palpa District in the Lumbini Zone of southern Nepal. At the time of the 2011 Nepal census it had a population of 3,112 people living in 665 individual households.

References

Populated places in Palpa District